Use Your Fingers is the debut studio album by Bloodhound Gang. It was released on July 18, 1995, by Cheese Factory Records. Some of the songs on the album were reworked version of demos from Bloodhound Gang's earlier demo tapes. The album has sold 250,000 copies to date.

Track listing
All songs written and composed by Jimmy Pop and Daddy Long Legs unless noted.

 "Rip Taylor Is God" – 1:23 (featuring Rip Taylor)
 "We Are the Knuckleheads" – 2:39
 "Legend in My Spare Time" – 3:05
 "B.H.G.P.S.A." – 0:22
 "Mama Say" (Pop, Legs, Duran Duran) – 2:59
 "Kids in America" (Wilde, Wilde) – 4:23 (cover of Kim Wilde's 1981 hit) 
 "You're Pretty When I'm Drunk" – 3:56
 "The Evils of Placenta Hustling" – 0:19
 "One Way" (Bloodhound Gang) – 3:05
 "Shitty Record Offer" – 0:58
 "Go Down" – 2:26
 "Earlameyer the Butt Pirate" – 0:11
 "No Rest for the Wicked" – 2:50
 "She Ain't Got No Legs" – 2:28
 "We Like Meat" – 0:04
 "Coo Coo Ca Choo" – 2:36
 "Rang Dang" (Pop, Legs, Glover, Robinson) – 3:02
 "Nightmare at the Apollo" – 0:56
 "K.I.D.S. Incorporated" – 2:20 (TV series theme song cover)
 "Bloodhound Sex Scene" – 0:47

Legacy 
In a review for Amazon, music journalist Roni Sarig said "BG back up their obnoxious idiocy with some fairly wise musical maneuvering. While their age and background lead them to repeatedly mine the '80s for material--Duran Duran and Cure samples, Michael Jackson and Blondie interpolations, a "Kids in America" cover—their sly comments and ingenious a cappella snippets prove they're surprisingly sharp and able lads."

On August 7, 2015, OC Weekly published a 20-year anniversary write-up of the album, stating "what makes Use Your Fingers worthy of re-examining two decades later is how much this album not only shouldn't exist from a legal perspective, but how it managed to predict so much of the 20 years of musical trends that followed it," and praising it as a "unique entry in the hip-hop canon from a sampling production standpoint, an impressive assortment of acknowledgments from a pop culture junkie standpoint, and overall one of the rare albums whose sheer existence is just as bizarre as the music it contains."

Credits 
Bloodhound Gang
 Jimmy Pop - lead vocals, rhythm guitar, production
 Daddy Long Legs - lead vocals, bass, production
 Skip O' Pot2Mus - drums, backing vocals
 M.S.G. - turntables, backing vocals
 Lüpüs Thünder - lead guitar, backing vocals

Additional musicians
 Rip Taylor - spoken word on "Rip Taylor Is God"
 Kyle Seifert - drums on "Kids In America"
 Rob Vitale - vocals on "Kids In America"
 Keith O'Quinn - trombone on "She Ain't Got No Legs"
 Joe Shepley - trumpet on "She Ain't Got No Legs"
 Kenny Venezia - tenor sax on "She Ain't Got No Legs"
 Michael 'Spanky G' Guthier - drums on "K.I.D.S. Incorporated"
 Daddy Long Legs - lead vocals and bass on "K.I.D.S. Incorporated"
 J.J. Bottari - engineering on "Mama Say"
 Richie Gagliadotto - engineering on "Go Down" and "Shitty Record Offer"
 Rick Denzien - mix engineer on "Rang Dang", "We Are The Knuckleheads" and "No Rest For The Wicked"
 Chris Interrante, - assistant engineer to Rick Denzien
 Jim Janik - engineering on "She Ain't Got No Legs"
 Robert Friedrich, Troy Halderson - assistant engineers to Jim Janik

Personnel
 Tom Ruff - mastering on "Use Your Fingers"
 Aimée Macauley - art direction and design
 Ari Marcopoulos - photography
 Christopher Bisagni - photograph of Nicole Brier
 Jed Corenthal, Gerard Babbits - product managers

References

Bloodhound Gang albums
1995 debut albums
Columbia Records albums
Cheese Factory Records albums